The Sheppton Mine disaster and rescue in Sheppton, Pennsylvania, United States, was one of the first rescues of trapped miners accomplished by raising them through holes bored through solid rock, an event that gripped the world's attention during August 1963. 

The roof of the Sheppton anthracite coal mine collapsed on August 13 and three miners were trapped 300 feet below ground. A small borehole was drilled from the surface in an attempt to contact the miners. After several days a borehole successfully reached a mine, and revealed that two of the miners, Henry Throne and David Fellin, had survived in a small, narrow chamber. Rescuers dropped provisions to the miners and subsequent larger boreholes were made, including the final large hole bored with the assistance of billionaire Howard Hughes, and the two surviving miners were successfully raised to the surface on August 27. Attempts to contact the third miner, Louis Bova, were unsuccessful. 

In 1971, The Buoys recorded a hit single "Timothy", about three miners trapped underground due to a cave-in, with only two of them surviving and a strong implication they survived by cannibalizing the third.  This led many to assume the song was inspired by the Sheppton disaster, but songwriter Rupert Holmes insisted he had never heard of the incident and would not have written the song if he had.  Lead singer Bill Kelly backed up this account.

In 2015, a Pennsylvania state historical marker was installed near the site where a third miner remains entombed.

That same year, the book Sheppton: The Myth, Miracle & Music, explored themes of the miraculous and supernatural at the Sheppton disaster site. After they were rescued, Throne and Fellin related similar stories of having seen human-like figures (including the recently deceased Pope John XXIII), crosses, stairs, and other religious imagery. While the shared visions were similar, they varied enough in the details to suggest the miners had experienced folie à deux.

References

1963 in Pennsylvania
History of Schuylkill County, Pennsylvania
Coal mining disasters in Pennsylvania
1963 mining disasters
1963 disasters in the United States
Disasters in Pennsylvania